WJAR (channel 10) is a television station in Providence, Rhode Island, United States, affiliated with NBC. Owned by Sinclair Broadcast Group, the station has studios on Kenney Drive in Cranston, Rhode Island (shared with Telemundo owned-and-operated stations WYCN-LD and WRIW-CD), and its transmitter is located in Rehoboth, Massachusetts.

History
WJAR-TV signed on for the first time on July 10, 1949, broadcasting on channel 11. It was Rhode Island's first television station and the fourth in New England. It was owned by The Outlet Company, a department store chain headquartered in Providence, along with WJAR radio (AM 920, now WHJJ; and FM 95.5, now occupied by WLVO). In 1952, after hearing about repeated instances of interference in Connecticut between WJAR-TV and New York City's WPIX (also on channel 11), the Federal Communications Commission (FCC)'s Sixth Report and Order changed the television allocations for Providence and forced the station to move to channel 10, which it did in the spring of 1953. At that time, WJAR's coverage area increased, since the interference with WPIX had been rectified.

WJAR-TV initially carried programming from all four networks of the time (NBC, ABC, DuMont, and CBS), but has always been a primary NBC affiliate due to WJAR radio's long affiliation with NBC Radio. Despite this, WJAR only carried a little more than half of NBC's program schedule during its early years on the air; WJAR also broadcast about half of the CBS network schedule and a couple of shows each from ABC and DuMont every week. It lost ABC in 1953 when WNET-TV (channel 16, now WNAC-TV on channel 64) signed on, and lost CBS in 1955 when WPRO-TV (now WPRI-TV) launched. When WNET-TV went dark in 1956, WJAR shared ABC programming with WPRO-TV until WTEV (now WLNE-TV) signed on in 1963. During the late 1950s, WJAR-TV was also briefly affiliated with the NTA Film Network. In 1954, WJAR-TV received national attention for its coverage of Hurricane Carol; newsreel films shot by WJAR cameramen of the storm and its aftermath not only appeared on the station, but also fed to CBS and NBC for use on their evening news programs.

For many years in the 1970s, WJAR-TV broadcast men's basketball games of Providence College and the University of Rhode Island, with Chris Clark calling play-by-play. In the early 1970s, when PC was one of the top teams in the country (and the top college basketball team in New England), their home games at the newly opened Providence Civic Center were often sellouts, despite the fact that WJAR televised many of these home games live.

In November 1980, the Outlet Company left the department store business to concentrate on broadcasting. A year earlier, the station moved its studios from the Outlet Building to a three-story modern production facility next door. The department store remained standing until 1986, when it burned to the ground in a spectacular fire. WJAR cameras perched on the neighboring rooftop captured the most dramatic footage. In April 1993, the station's studios were moved to their current location in an industrial area of Cranston just south of Providence. Three years later, Outlet Communications merged with NBC, making WJAR the second network-owned station in the market (CBS owned WPRI-TV for parts of 1995 and 1996 before it was forced to sell the station to Clear Channel Communications after CBS and Westinghouse merged due to a significant signal overlap with WBZ-TV).

In April 1997, WJAR began to operate WB affiliate WLWC (which was owned by Fant Broadcasting) under a local marketing agreement (LMA). Even by the time that station signed on, the future of the LMA was in doubt given the fact that NBC, which inherited the arrangement from Outlet, did not want to run stations outside their core owned-and-operated outlets. The network, during this time, pushed Fant to sell WLWC. In September 1997, NBC came up with a three-way swap in which Fant exchanged WLWC and sister station WWHO in Columbus, Ohio to Paramount/Viacom for that group's NBC affiliate in Hartford, Connecticut, WVIT.

WJAR was one of four NBC O&Os in smaller markets that were put up for sale on January 9, 2006, along with stations in Columbus, Birmingham, Alabama, and Raleigh, North Carolina. Except for the Birmingham station, these were also once owned by Outlet. On April 6, 2006, NBC Universal and Media General announced that Media General would purchase WJAR as part of a $600 million four station deal between the two companies. The deal was approved by the FCC on June 26. As a result, WJAR became Media General's first television station in New England. For all intents and purposes, this undid the NBC-Outlet merger a decade earlier.

In its earliest days, WJAR's logo included a Rhode Island Red rooster, the state bird of Rhode Island. Prior to WJAR's purchase by NBC, it had included various versions of a different stylized "10" above the WJAR call letters. This had been in effect for the previous twenty years. The stylized "10" was initially retained after the purchase, but with the NBC peacock attached to the right-hand side and the call letters removed. This was dropped in 2002 in favor of an "NBC 10" logo first used on former sister station WCAU in Philadelphia. A modified version, used on newscasts starting in 2007, was designed and arranged similarly to other Media General station logos. In February 2014, both versions of that logo were replaced with the station's current logo.

On March 21, 2014, LIN Media entered into an agreement to merge with Media General in a $1.6 billion deal. Because LIN already owned CBS affiliate WPRI and operated Fox affiliate WNAC-TV, and the two stations rank among the four highest-rated stations in the Providence market in total day viewership, the companies were required to sell either WJAR or WPRI-TV; on August 20, 2014, Media General announced that it would keep WPRI and the LMA with WNAC and sell WJAR, along with WLUK-TV and WCWF in Green Bay and WTGS in Savannah, Georgia, to the Sinclair Broadcast Group in exchange for KXRM-TV and KXTU-LD in Colorado Springs, WHTM in Harrisburg (which Sinclair, on behalf of Allbritton is planning on to divest) and WTTA in Tampa Bay. WHTM's sale of Media General was explored nearly two months earlier, and it was completed, nearly three months before the Media General/LIN deal was completed. 
The sale was completed on December 19, marking Sinclair's return to owning a Providence market station after a year and a half, as it owned WLWC from January 2012 until April 2013.

Programming
In addition to its local newscasts, WJAR clears the entire NBC network schedule, though during the late 1970s up to 1995, WJAR preempted NBC's noon programming for their noon newscast. Syndicated programming on WJAR includes Live with Kelly and Ryan (which delays the fourth hour of Today), Dateline and Extra, among others.

News operation

WJAR broadcasts 37½ hours of locally produced newscasts each week (with six hours each weekday, 3½ hours on Saturdays and four hours on Sundays).

For most of its history, WJAR has been the far-and-away ratings leader in the Providence–New Bedford market. WPRI is consistently in second place, while WLNE has usually been a distant third. This can be attributed to WJAR being the state's oldest station, as well as its association with its well established radio sisters. In all four Nielsen ratings periods in 2016, the station was number one in all time slots.

In mid-1988, WJAR broke a tradition in its market: it began broadcasting news on weekdays at 5:30 p.m. with The 5:30 Report (renamed in 1992 as Up-front at 5:30), that included the top stories of the day, plus a cooking segment, weather and entertainment news. It was expanded to one hour in January 1995, and was restructured as a conventional newscast.

In 2000, WJAR's news opens started off with "Thank you for turning to 10" before opening their newscasts. However, it was dropped in 2008.

On two occasions, WJAR has produced a prime time newscast at 10. The first began in April 1997 (entitled TV 28 News at 10) and was seen weeknights on WLWC in competition to the WPRI-produced show on Fox affiliate WNAC-TV. The broadcast was dropped that September when the LMA with WLWC ended. The second attempt has been airing on weeknights since October 1, 2007 when the station began producing NBC 10 News 10 at 10 on its NBC Weather Plus digital subchannel. It was originally a live ten-minute production consisting of top stories of the day along with an updated weather forecast.

When WJAR-DT2 switched to RTV, the show expanded to a half-hour and was renamed NBC 10 News 10 at 10 on RTV. A new segment was added called "Flashback" which features vintage footage of past personnel. WLNE occasionally aired news at that time when it operated Cox channel 5 as NewsChannel 5, primarily when sports preempted WNAC's newscast. On September 6, 2010, WJAR began airing the area's second newscast weeknights at 7 joining WLNE. However, it also airs on Saturday nights unlike the other channel's weeknight production. WLNE's newscast was officially canceled in April 2011.

WJAR is notable for having employed three Today Show personalities.  Former Today hosts Matt Lauer and Meredith Vieira worked at WJAR. Vieira started out as a reporter on the station in the late-1970s while Lauer was co-host of WJAR's version of PM Magazine in the early-1980s. In 2012, former WJAR meteorologist Dylan Dreyer became began doing weekend weather on Today. Other notable alumni include CNN Chief International Correspondent Christiane Amanpour and ESPN anchor Steve Berthiaume. In 2008, WJAR was awarded the National Edward R. Murrow Award for Overall Excellence for a small-market television station. In 2010, the station's website won a second national Murrow. In 2011, the station won its third national Murrow in a row, this time in the "Breaking News" category for its coverage of recent historic flooding. In 2012, the station's web site won a regional Edward R. Murrow Award.

On May 16, 2011, WJAR became the first station in the Providence market to air newscasts in high-definition. A new set was constructed for the transition to HD and debuted on NBC 10 News Sunrise that morning. Photos of the set as it was being built were posted on the station's Facebook page. During construction, newscasts were broadcast from a temporary set in the station's Studio B. Several technological upgrades were also made.
In addition to its main studios, WJAR operates two news bureaus. The Bay State Newsroom is located at the old Standard-Times building on Pleasant Street in New Bedford. The Downcity Bureau is on Dorrance Street in Downtown Providence. The station uses a live weather radar feed from the National Weather Service's Local Forecast Office on Myles Standish Boulevard in Taunton, Massachusetts.

In June 2015, after being sold to Sinclair, they brought back the "Thank you for turning to 10" before opening their newscasts when the Sinclair graphics debuted. However, it was dropped again on September 23, 2019, before being reinstated some time later.

On September 6, 2022, WJAR introduced an hour-long 4 p.m. newscast, known as NBC 10 News at 4:00, to act as a replacement for the recently canceled Ellen DeGeneres Show.

Ocean State Networks (OSN)

On May 2, 2012, WJAR partnered with Cox Communications to launch Ocean State Networks (OSN). This channel replaces NewsChannel 5 (formerly the Rhode Island News Channel), operated by Cox and WLNE-TV from November 30, 1998 until February 1, 2012, when WJAR programming first appeared on the channel. OSN airs rebroadcasts of WJAR's newscasts throughout the day and night, as well as its lifestyle show Studio 10, Special Olympics R.I. and its longtime public affairs program, 10 News Conference. Prior to 2017, it also aired Cox Sports programming, including live local high school and collegiate sports events with teams featured on OSN including the Pawtucket Red Sox, Providence Friars, Rhode Island Rams, and the Rhode Island Interscholastic League. However, since 2017 with the launch of YurView New England, which is available next to OSN itself on Cox Cable channel 4 and in high-definition on channel 1004, most (if not all) sporting events have since been moved over to the former and more rebroadcasts of WJAR's newscasts have been shown on OSN since then. The channel is exclusively available to Cox Cable subscribers on channel 5 and in high-definition on channel 1005. As a result of the launch of OSN back in 2012, Cox Sports (channels 3 and HD 1003) was removed from the lineup, with all programming being moved to OSN until 2017.

Notable former on-air staff
Christiane Amanpour – CNN, ABC News
Brooke Anderson – CNN
Denise LeClair Cobb – CNN, CNN Headline News
Steve Berthiaume – ESPN, Fox Sports Arizona
Dylan Dreyer – NBC News
Jack Edwards – ESPN, NESN
Kathryn Tappen – NBC Sports/NBCSN
Jim Taricani (deceased)
Meredith Vieira – NBC News
Doug White – WGBH-TV, WPRI-TV (deceased)

Technical information

Subchannels
The station's digital signal is multiplexed:

In January 2009, WJAR began broadcasting the Retro Television Network on its second digital channel and digital cable. WJAR-DT2 had previously carried NBC Weather Plus. WJAR replaced RTV with MeTV on September 26, 2011, as part of a groupwide affiliation agreement with Media General; the channel replaced RTV on some Media General-owned stations in other markets.

On September 1, 2022, MeTV was replaced with Charge!.

Analog-to-digital conversion
WJAR discontinued regular programming on its analog signal, over VHF channel 10, on February 17, 2009, the original date in which full-power television stations in the United States were to transition from analog to digital broadcasts under federal mandate (which was later pushed back to June 12, 2009). The station's digital signal remained on its pre-transition UHF channel 51, using PSIP to display the station's virtual channel as its former VHF analog channel 10. This allowed ShopNBC station WWDP to begin operation of its permanent digital facility on channel 10.

Availability in other Massachusetts counties
WJAR has traditionally been available in many other Massachusetts municipalities outside Bristol County, mainly in Plymouth County and Cape Cod. On December 8, 2011, cable operator Comcast had to move WJAR off channel 10 outside Bristol County, due to a must-carry claim by WWDP asking for carriage on cable channel 10 (along with later claims by WBTS-CD for channel 10). Thus, outside of Bristol County on Xfinity and Verizon Fios, its carriage ranges between channels 96 and 99.

References

External links

NBC network affiliates
Sinclair Broadcast Group
Television channels and stations established in 1949
JAR
JAR
Charge! (TV network) affiliates
Comet (TV network) affiliates
TBD (TV network) affiliates
Mass media in Providence, Rhode Island
1949 establishments in Rhode Island